Paolo Guerci is an Italian engineer who has spent his career in auto racing.

Career
Guerci joined forces with retired racing driver Guido Forti to form the Forti racing team in 1972. In 1994, Guido Forti found a new business partner in Carlo Gancia, who bought Guerci's shares in the team and set about raising the budget needed for Formula One with help from driver Pedro Diniz's family. Guerci stayed on as a race engineer for the team during its time in F1.

Guerci was a principal member of the technical staff of Italian Formula Three Championship Passoli Racing, alongside former Ferrari and Brabham chief mechanic Ermanno Cuoghi. Guerci left the team after Cesare Passoli's death in 2008. He is currently Technical Director of the Italian International Formula Master team Alan Racing. He also collaborates with the racing team RP Motorsport in Piacenza. His son, Davide Guerci, followed the steps of his father and works for the Formula Three team Down Force and the Formula Renault team GSK Motorsport.

References

Italian motorsport people
Living people
Year of birth missing (living people)
Formula One team owners